Edward Waller Hobson (5 December 1851 – 17 April 1924) was an Irish Anglican  clergyman.

Hobson was educated at the Royal School Dungannon and Trinity College, Oxford, where he graduated with a Master of Arts;  and ordained in 1877  After a curacy  in Kingstown he held incumbencies at Moy, Derryloran and Portadown. He also held chaplaincy roles to the Lord Lieutenant of Ireland and the Lord Primate of All Ireland.  He became Archdeacon of Armagh in 1915, a post he held until his death. At the same time as his appointment as archdeacon, he was appointed the librarian to the Armagh Public Library.

Personal life 
Hobson was the son of Canon John Meade Hobson.

On 11 June 1891 Hobson married Frances Maria Hall-Dare, daughter of Robert Westley Hall-Dare and Frances Anne Catharine Lambart. They had no children.

References 

1851 births
People educated at the Royal School Dungannon
Alumni of Trinity College Dublin
Archdeacons of Armagh
19th-century Irish Anglican priests
20th-century Irish Anglican priests
1924 deaths